Nahual is a genus of hubbardiid short-tailed whipscorpions, first described by Monjaraz-Ruedas, Prendini & Francke in 2019.

Species 
, the World Schizomida Catalog accepts the following four species:

 Nahual bokmai Monjaraz-Ruedas, Prendini & Francke, 2019 – Mexico
 Nahual caballero (Monjaraz-Ruedas & Francke, 2018) – Mexico
 Nahual lanceolatus (Rowland, 1975) – Mexico
 Nahual pallidus (Rowland, 1975) – Mexico

References 

Schizomida genera
Arthropods of Mexico
Animals described in 2019